Bhairon Singh Shekhawat became Chief Minister of Rajasthan, India for second time in 1990 as leader of Bharatiya Janata Party and Janata Dal alliance. In 1990 election to Rajasthan Legislative Assembly out of total 200 seats Bharatiya Janata Party won 85 and Janata Dal won 50 seats. Shekhawat was sworn in as chief minister on 4 March 1990. Here are the names of the ministers:

Cabinet ministers
Bhairon Singh Shekhawat-Chief minister 
Lalit Kishore Chaturvedi
Bhanwar Lal Sharma  
Nathu Singh  
K. K. Goyal 
Digvijay Singh
Sumitra Singh 
Chaturbhuj Verma 
Pushpa Jain 
Vijay Singh Jhala 
Ram Kishore Meena  
Dr. Chandra Bhan

Ministers of State
Mohan Meghwal
Jivraj Kataria
Kundan Lai Miglani 
Chuni Lai Girasia
Harlal Kharra
Ramzan Khan
Fateh Singh
Kalu Lal Gurjar

See also
First Shekhawat ministry

References

Shekhawat 02
1990 in Indian politics
Bharatiya Janata Party state ministries
1990 establishments in Rajasthan
1992 disestablishments in India
Cabinets established in 1990
Cabinets disestablished in 1992